This is a list of the 5 members of the European Parliament for Malta in the 2009 to 2014 session. One person from Labour Party entered the Parliament in December 2011, bringing the number of MEPs to 6.

List

Party representation

Notes

Malta
List
2009